V. Madhusoodanan Nair is an Indian poet and critic of Malayalam literature, who is credited with contributions in popularizing poetry through recitation. He is best known for Naranathu Bhranthan, the poem with the most editions in Malayalam literature as well as his music albums featuring recitations of his own poems and poems of other major poets. Kerala Sahitya Akademi honoured him with their annual award for poetry in 1993. He is also a recipient many other honours including Sahitya Akademi Award, Asan Smaraka Kavitha Puraskaram, Padmaprabha Literary Award, Kunju Pillai Award, R. G. Mangalom Award, Souparnikatheeram Prathibhapuraskaram and Janmashtami Puraskaram.

Biography 

V. Madhusoodanan Nair was born on February 25, 1949, at Aruviyodu, a small riverside village near Neyyattinkara, in Thiruvananthapuram, the capital of the south Indian state of Kerala to N. K. Velayudhan Pillai and Gourikutty Amma. He imbibed quite early the tradition of many a ritualistic song from his father, who was a reciter of Thottam Pattu. His early schooling was at the local schools in Neyyattinkara and Kotturkonam after which he passed a pre-degree course from Velu Thampi Memorial Nair Service Society College. Subsequently, he graduated from Mahatma Gandhi College and earned a master's degree from the University College Thiruvananthapuram. He started his career as a journalist, working at Kumkumam magazine and Veekshanam daily and also as a program announcer at the Thiruvananthapuram station of the All India Radio before working as a sub-editor at Kerala Bhasha Institute. Later, he shifted to academics by joining St. Xavier's College, Thiruvananthapuram as a faculty from where he superannuated from service as the Professor and Head of the Department of Malayalam.

Madhusoodanan Nair  is married to S. Malathi Devi and the couple has two daughters,  Rashmi and Ramya and a son, Vishnu. The family lives in Devaswom Board Junction, Thiruvananthapuram.

Legacy 

Madhusoodanan Nair started writing poems while at school and the first of his poems was published in the 1980s; his first poem anthology, Naranathu Bhranthan was published in 1992. The book is reported to be the most popular poetry anthology ever in Malayalam literature, with over 40 editions, surpassing the second most printed book, Ramanan of Changampuzha Krishna Pillai, which had 18 editions as of 2016. He is known to be conversant with several languages including Malayalam, English, Hindi, Sanskrit and Tamil. Besides poems, he has published five non-fiction books including Eliotum Richardsum, a critical study, Science Nikhantu, a lexicon and Nadodi Vignanam, a book on the folklore of Kerala. He has written the lyrics for three Malayalam films viz. Santhanagopalam, Kulam and Ardhanaari while his poems have been used in films such as Daivathinte Vikrithikal, Punyam, Punarjani and Veettilekkulla Vazhi. He also wrote lyrics for Tharangini and Manorama Music.

Awards and honours 
Madhusoodanan Nair received the Kunju Pillai Award for Poetry in 1986, followed by the K. Balakrishnan Award in 1990. Kerala Sahitya Akademi selected his debut anthology, Naranathu Bhranthan, for their annual award for poetry in 1993. A decade later, he was awarded the 2003 Asan Smaraka Kavitha Puraskaram, the same year as he received two more awards viz. R. G. Mangalom Award and the Souparnikatheeram Prathibhapuraskaram. In 2015 he received the Kadammanitta Ramakrishnan Award and Janmashtami Puraskaram and a year later, he was awarded the Padmaprabha Literary Award in 2016. Sahitya Akademi selected his work, Achan Piranna Veedu for their annual award in 2019.

Bibliography

Poetry 

 
 
 Bharatheeyam 
 
 Agasthyahridayam
 
 Ganga
 
 Megangale Keezhadanguvin
 Marubhoomiyile Kinar
  Pongala
 Nataraja Smriti
 Sakshi

Non-fiction 

 Eliotum Richardsum (Criticism) Kerala Bhasha Institute
 Asia Kanmunpil (Sociological study) Kerala Bhasha Institute
 Science Nikhantu (Lexical study) Kerala Bhasha Institute
 Nadodi Vignanam (Folklore of Kerala) (Kerala Vignanakosam)
 Budhivikasam (Special education) Kanmani Publishers

Filmography 

 Santhanagopalam
 Kulam
 Ardhanaari
 Daivathinte Vikrithikal
 Punyam
 Punarjani
 Veettilekkulla Vazhi

See also 

 List of Malayalam-language authors by category
 List of Malayalam-language authors

References

External links 

 
 
 

1949 births
Living people
Indian male poets
Writers from Thiruvananthapuram
University College Thiruvananthapuram alumni
Articles containing video clips
20th-century Indian poets
Poets from Kerala
Malayalam poets
20th-century Indian male writers
21st-century Indian poets
University of Kerala alumni
Malayalam-language lyricists
20th-century Indian journalists
Academic staff of the University of Kerala
Recipients of the Sahitya Akademi Award in Malayalam